An irrelevant conclusion, also known as  or missing the point, is the informal fallacy of presenting an argument that may or may not be logically valid and sound, but (whose conclusion) fails to address the issue in question. It falls into the broad class of relevance fallacies.

The irrelevant conclusion should not be confused with formal fallacy, an argument whose conclusion does not follow from its premises; instead, it is that despite its formal consistency it is not relevant to the subject being talked about.

Overview
Ignoratio elenchi is one of the fallacies identified by Aristotle in his Organon. In a broader sense he asserted that all fallacies are a form of ignoratio elenchi.

● Example 1: A and B are debating as to whether criticizing indirectly has any merit in general.

 attempts to support their position with an argument that politics ought not to be criticized on social media because the message is not directly being heard by the head of state; this would make them guilty of ignoratio elenchi, as people such as B may be criticizing politics because they have a strong message for their peers, or because they wish to bring attention to political matters, rather than ever intending that their views would be directly read by the president.

● Example 2: A and B are debating about the law.

B missed the point. The question was not if B's neighbor believes that law should allow, but rather if the law does allow it or not.

Samuel Johnson's unique "refutation" of Bishop Berkeley's immaterialism, his claim that matter did not actually exist but only seemed to exist, has been described as ignoratio elenchi: during a conversation with Boswell, Johnson powerfully kicked a nearby stone and proclaimed of Berkeley's theory, "I refute it thus!" (See also argumentum ad lapidem.)

A related concept is that of the red herring, which is a deliberate attempt to divert a process of enquiry by changing the subject. Ignoratio elenchi is sometimes confused with straw man argument.

Etymology
The translation in English of the Latin expression has varied somewhat. Hamblin proposed "misconception of refutation" or "ignorance of refutation" as a literal translation, John Arthur Oesterle preferred "ignoring the issue", and Irving Copi, Christopher Tindale and others used "irrelevant conclusion".

See also

 Ad hominem
 Begging the question
 Chewbacca defense
 Enthymeme
 Evasion (ethics)
 Genetic fallacy
 List of fallacies
 Non sequitur (logic)
 Sophism
 Tone policing

References

Works cited

External links

 Appeal to Authority Breakdown, Examples, Definitions, & More
 Nizkor Project: Red Herring
 Fallacy Files: Red Herring
 The Phrase Finder: Red Herring
 The Art of Controversy: Diversion (bilingual with the original German) by Arthur Schopenhauer
 Red herring in political speech

Metaphors